Elections to Liverpool City Council were held on Monday 2 November 1891. One third of the council seats were up for election, the term of office of each councillor being three years.

After the election, the composition of the council was:

Election result

Ward results

* - Retiring Councillor seeking re-election

Abercromby

Castle Street

Everton

Exchange

Great George

Lime Street

North Toxteth

Pitt Street

Rodney Street

St. Anne Street

St. Paul's

St. Peter's

Scotland

South Toxteth

Vauxhall

West Derby

By-elections

No. 2, Scotland, 16 January 1892

Caused by the resignation of Councillor George Jeremy Lynsky (Irish Nationalist, Scotland, elected 1 November 1889) was reported to the council on 6 January 1892
.

Councillor Lynsky resigned his seat to become a candidate for the city coronership.

No. 10, Rodney Street, 

Caused by the resignation of Councillor Ernest Augustine Gibson (Liberal, Rodney Street, elected 1 November 1889), which was reported to the council on  3 February 1892.

No. 1, Everton ward, 16 February 1892

Caused by the death of Councillor Edward Whitley MP (Conservative, Everton ward, elected 1 November 1889).

Aldermanic By-election, 2 March 1892

The death of Alderman William John Lunt on 14 February 1892 was reported to the council on 2 March 1892.

To fill this position Edward Lawrence was elected by the council as an Alderman on 2 March 1892

See also

 Liverpool City Council
 Liverpool Town Council elections 1835 - 1879
 Liverpool City Council elections 1880–present
 Mayors and Lord Mayors of Liverpool 1207 to present
 History of local government in England

References

1891
1891 English local elections
1890s in Liverpool